Everybody's Fine is a 1990 Italian drama film directed by Giuseppe Tornatore who co-wrote the screenplay with Tonino Guerra and Massimo De Rita.

It won the Prize of the Ecumenical Jury (Giuseppe Tornatore) and was nominated for Golden Palm (Giuseppe Tornatore) at the 1990 Cannes Film Festival. It also won the David di Donatello Awards for David Best Music (Ennio Morricone) and the Italian National Syndicate of Film Journalists for Silver Ribbon Best Original Story (Giuseppe Tornatore).

The film was remade in 2009 as Everybody's Fine with an American setting and starring Robert De Niro, and again in 2016 in China also as  Everybody's Fine in 2016.

Plot
Matteo Scuro, a retired Sicilian bureaucrat and opera buff, has been stood up by his five adult children during the summer vacation, all of whom live in various cities on the Italian mainland with what he believes are responsible jobs. Despite their not visiting and the neighbours' criticisms, he remains optimistic, considering that his children could not come because they are too busy. His children are named after popular opera characters, Tosca for Puccini's Tosca, Canio for Leoncavallo's Pagliacci, Norma for Bellini's Norma, Guglielmo for Rossini's Guglielmo Tell and Alvaro for Verdi's La forza del destino.

He decides to surprise each of them with a visit, traveling by train, and finds none of them as he imagined, with each of his children seeming to reflect the opera character after whom they were named. Matteo's train journeys take him to Naples, Rome, Florence, Milan and Turin to search for each of his children; he even spends one night on the streets among the homeless. Before his arrival at each of their homes, each of his grown children scramble to put on a façade to cover up their personal failings:  One daughter's ex-husband temporarily moves back in with her and their child.  A son who lost his University professorship temporarily moves back into his old office.  Another daughter hides the fact that she works as a lingerie model, etc.  Finally, after visiting all his children, Scuro returns to Sicily, visits his wife's grave, and reports to her with irony that their children are all fine.

Main characters
Marcello Mastroianni: Matteo Scuro 
Michèle Morgan: Woman in train 
Valeria Cavalli: Tosca 
Marino Cenna: Canio 
Norma Martelli: Norma 
Roberto Nobile: Guglielmo 
Salvatore Cascio: Alvaro enfant

References

External links

1990 films
1990 drama films
Films directed by Giuseppe Tornatore
Films scored by Ennio Morricone
Films about old age
French drama films
Italian drama films
1990s Italian-language films
1990s French films